The Peyret-Nessler Avionette was a French  sports aircraft built in the mid 1920s. It featured a parasol monoplane layout.

Specifications

References

Single-engined tractor aircraft
Aircraft first flown in 1927